Paul Gerald De Lisle (born June 13, 1963) is a Canadian musician and songwriter. He is the bassist and the only consistent member of the pop rock band Smash Mouth since their formation in 1994.

Early life and education
De Lisle was born in Exeter, Ontario, the son of an Air Force pilot.

Career
In the early 1990s De Lisle was a member of the band Lackadaddy, which played hip-hop and punk music.

De Lisle was a founding member of Smash Mouth in 1994, and still performs with them.

Aside from Smash Mouth, De Lisle is also an avid surfer. He is also the writer of the band's single "Pacific Coast Party", among others.

De Lisle wrote Smash Mouth: The Official Biography, a history of the band.

De Lisle also stepped in as temporary vocalist after Harwell was taken ill mid-show at a concert in Urbana, Illinois on August 27, 2016.

References

External links
 Smash Mouth Official website
 Smash Mouth at MySpace

1963 births
Living people
People from Huron County, Ontario
Musicians from Ontario
Canadian rock musicians
Smash Mouth members
Canadian people of French descent